Mary Gloria Wilson Lawson was Louisiana’s first African American female lawyer.

She was the Southern University Law School’s first African American female law graduate. On June 12, 1956, Lawson became the first African American female admitted to practice law in Louisiana. Instead of practicing, however, she became a law librarian for the Southern University Law School.

See also 

 List of first women lawyers and judges in Louisiana

References 

Louisiana lawyers
American women lawyers
American women librarians
Law librarians
Southern University Law Center alumni
American librarians